Scott Christian Higher Secondary School (SCHSS) is one of the oldest higher secondary schools in Kanyakumari district, Tamil Nadu. It is being run by CSI Kanyakumari Diocese. It is situated at the centre of the Nagercoil Town.

Activities and awards
The school has many Social Activities like
NCC- National cadet crops
NSS- National Service Scheme
YRC- Youth red cross
Scout
Interact Club
Green Club
Red Ribbon Club
The school has spacious playgrounds with trees for shade around the contours. A football ground is situated nearby but outside of the school campus.

The school timing
School is open on week days from Monday to Friday.
The timings are, as follows:
Start - 09:00 a.m.
Dismissal - 04:30.p.m 
And Special Classes for 10th and 12th Students 
on Saturdays and Morning 1 hour and evening 1 hour on all Week days.
Apart from these standard timings,
many extracurricular activities are held after school.
(e.g. inter-class football, cricket, Hockey etc.).

See also
 Scott Christian College

References

External links 
 Scott Christian College
 http://wikimapia.org/171805/Scott-Christian-Higher-Secondary-School-Nagercoil-Tamilnadu-India
 http://wikimapia.org/12834685/Scott-Christian-Higher-Secondary-School
 http://bbs.keyhole.com/ubb/ubbthreads.php?ubb=showflat&Number=522809
 http://www.indicareer.com/schools-of-Convent-in-Tamil%20Nadu.html
 https://archive.today/20130505034727/http://bbs.keyhole.com/ubb/ubbthreads.php?ubb=showflat&Number=522809

Christian schools in Tamil Nadu
High schools and secondary schools in Tamil Nadu
Schools in Kanyakumari district
Education in Nagercoil
Educational institutions established in 1819
1819 establishments in India